Petit Standard is the eighth studio album and third jazz album by Croatian singer and songwriter Vesna Pisarović, globally released on 28 January 2019 by Jazzwerkstatt. The album includes collaborations with the three jazz musicians Joe Fonda, John Betsch and Gebhard Ullmann. The album features eleven cover versions of popular jazz songs originally performed by Steve Lacy, Charles Mingus and Mal Waldron.

Background and recording
After her second jazz album Naša velika pjesmarica, Pisarović confirmed how she planned to released another jazz record before announcing her pop comeback. Prior to recording Petit Standard, Pisarović has been collaborating and performing with the Petit Standard Trio. Throughout 2014 and 2016 Pisarović performed songs from Petit Standard live before recording them in 2018.  According to Pisarović, nearly all of the songs were recorded in one take. The album was made in a studio in Bruxelles, which was reserved for two days, but all 11 songs were recorded in the first day. 

Pisarović described the album as an "atypical romantic homage to everything that's small and sweet".

A German tour to promote the album was scheduled in 2020 but got cancelled due to the Covid-19 pandemic. A new tour to promote the album has been scheduled for October 2022.

Track listing
Credits adapted from AllMusic.

Personnel
Credits adapted from Amazon Music.

Musicians
Vesna Pisarović – vocals
Joe Fonda – double bass
John Betsch – drums
Gebhard Ullmann – tenor saxophone, bass clarinet

Technical
Vesna Pisarović – producer
Ulli Blobel - executive production
Adrian von Ripka - mixing, mastering

Artwork
Hrvoje Zalukar - photography
Herbert Weisrock - creative direction, design, layout

Release history

References

2019 albums
Vesna Pisarović albums